Steven Lamarr Hood (born April 4, 1968) is an American former professional basketball player born in Lynchburg, Virginia. In high school Hood starred for DeMatha Catholic High School in Hyattsville, Maryland, from 1983 to 1986 and was selected as a 1986 McDonald's All-American. He then received an athletic scholarship to play for the Maryland Terrapins men's basketball team. After two seasons, Hood transferred to James Madison University (JMU) to play for coach Lefty Driesell, who recruited Hood from high school. Driesell was the coach at Maryland when he recruited Hood but left the summer before Hood went to play at UMD.

After sitting out for one season upon the transfer per NCAA rules, Hood became one of the most feared players in the Colonial Athletic Association (CAA). He started all 60 games for the Dukes and in both seasons with them was named the Colonial Athletic Association Men's Basketball Player of the Year both seasons.

Hood was selected in the second round of the 1991 NBA Draft by the Sacramento Kings (42nd overall). Hood played for several teams overseas in Europe in his pro career.

References
(Beekman, Jennifer) Hood to go into JMU Hall of Fame. The Gazette (6 April 2005). Retrieved on 9 September 2009.
Steve Hood. CheckOutMyCards.com. Retrieved on 9 September 2009.
McDonald's High School All-Americans. Basketball-reference.com. Retrieved on 9 September 2009.

1968 births
Living people
American expatriate basketball people in Australia
American expatriate basketball people in France
American expatriate basketball people in Greece
American expatriate basketball people in Israel
American expatriate basketball people in Japan
American expatriate basketball people in the Philippines
American expatriate basketball people in Spain
American men's basketball players
Ampelokipoi B.C. players
Barangay Ginebra San Miguel players
Basketball players from Maryland
Bnei Hertzeliya basketball players
Canberra Cannons players
CB Granada players
CB Peñas Huesca players
DeMatha Catholic High School alumni
Fort Wayne Fury players
Ironi Ramat Gan players
James Madison Dukes men's basketball players
JDA Dijon Basket players
Liga ACB players
Maccabi Haifa B.C. players
Maryland Terrapins men's basketball players
People from Hyattsville, Maryland
Philippine Basketball Association imports
Rockford Lightning players
Sacramento Kings draft picks
Shooting guards
Shreveport Crawdads players
Shreveport Storm players
Sportspeople from Lynchburg, Virginia
Sportspeople from the Washington metropolitan area